Steve Simon (born December 12, 1969) is an American politician from the state of Minnesota serving as the 22nd Minnesota Secretary of State. A member of the Minnesota Democratic–Farmer–Labor Party (DFL), he previously represented District 46B in the Minnesota House of Representatives.

Early life, education, and career
Simon graduated from Hopkins High School in Minnetonka, then went on to Tufts University in Medford, Massachusetts, receiving his B.A. in Political Science in 1992. He earned his J.D. from the University of Minnesota Law School in 1996. He worked as an assistant attorney general for Minnesota attorneys general Hubert H. Humphrey III and Mike Hatch from 1996 to 2001, and has been an associate with the law firm of Robins, Kaplan, Miller, and Ciresi since 2001.

Minnesota House of Representatives
Simon was first elected in 2004, and was re-elected in 2006, 2008, 2010, and 2012.

On Monday, May 2, 2011, Simon testified regarding and opposed a proposed constitutional amendment to ban gay marriage in Minnesota. His comments drew national attention: "How many more gay people does God have to create before we ask ourselves whether or not God actually wants them around?"

2014 and 2018 Minnesota Secretary of State campaigns

On August 6, 2013, Simon announced his candidacy in the 2014 Minnesota Secretary of State election. He narrowly defeated Republican Dan Severson for the office. Simon was re-elected by a fairly large margin in 2018. As of 2021, Simon has never lost an election.

Personal life
Steve Simon is married to Leia Christoffer Simon, and they have two children together. Active in his local community, Simon is a member of the TwinWest Chamber of Commerce, the American Cancer Society, the local League of Women Voters, the St. Louis Park Community Education Advisory Council, and the Lenox Foundation, which raises funds for the St. Louis Park Senior Program. He is a member of Temple Israel, serves on the board of the Minnesota Chapter of the Jewish Community Relations Council, and is an attorney.

Electoral history

References

External links

Government website
Steve Simon for Secretary of State official campaign website

Steve Simon for State Representative campaign website (archived)

|-

1969 births
21st-century American politicians
20th-century American Jews
Living people
Democratic Party members of the Minnesota House of Representatives
People from Hopkins, Minnesota
People from St. Louis Park, Minnesota
Secretaries of State of Minnesota
Tufts University School of Arts and Sciences alumni
University of Minnesota Law School alumni
Hopkins High School alumni
21st-century American Jews